Kiwifruit or kiwi is a major horticultural export earner for New Zealand. New Zealand developed the first commercially viable kiwifruit and developed export markets, creating the demand for the fruit that exists today. Today New Zealand is the third largest kiwifruit producing country, next to China and Italy, and holds approximately 30% of the market share. In the 2008–2009 season the value of New Zealand kiwifruit exports was NZ$1.45 billion.

Origin of the fruit

Cultivation of the fuzzy kiwifruit spread from China in the early 20th century, when seeds were introduced to New Zealand by Mary Isabel Fraser, the principal of Whanganui Girls' College who had been visiting mission schools in Yichang, China. The seeds were planted in 1906 by a Whanganui nurseryman, Alexander Allison, with the vines first fruiting in 1910. A New Zealand horticulturalist developed the well-known green kiwifruit in Avondale, New Zealand, around 1924. This well known green kiwifruit were later renamed "Hayward" as a tribute to its creator, Hayward Wright.

Origins of the industry
The first commercial planting of Chinese gooseberries occurred in 1937 by the orchardist Jim MacLoughlin. He found that the vines were low maintenance and fruited well. By 1940, MacLoughlin purchased more property for Chinese gooseberry production. MacLoughlin's truck was commandeered for army use during the outbreak of war and as a result, he was forced to sell his property and enter into a shared cropping arrangement with another farmer. In 1955, MacLoughlin bought out his partner, purchasing his land back along with an additional 38 acres and planting it all to Chinese gooseberries.
During the war around 550 cases of the fruit were marketed each season with the fruit proving popular with American servicemen in New Zealand. This provided the opportunity for the previously domestically-consumed fruit industry to expand by exporting to an international market.

Initial growth of the export market
In 1952, MacLoughlin approached the New Zealand Fruit Federation who agreed to facilitate the shipping and marketing of the fruit to United States markets, this was New Zealand's first export of Chinese gooseberries. Due to pioneering research into the transportability of the fruit by John Pilkington Hudson and others at the agriculture department in Wellington, this was the first international export of the kiwifruit.

Rebranding the Chinese gooseberry
As the local popularity of this fruit increased, New Zealanders discarded the local Chinese name for the fruit (yáng táo) in favour of the name Chinese gooseberry. Among the exporters was the prominent produce company Turners and Growers, who were calling the berries melonettes, because the local name for the fruit, Chinese gooseberry, had political connotations due to the Cold War, and to further distinguish it from European gooseberries, which are prone to a fungus called anthracnose. An American importer, Norman Sondag of San Francisco, complained that melonettes was as bad as Chinese gooseberry because melons and berries were both subject to high import tariffs, and instead asked for a short Māori name that quickly connoted New Zealand. In June 1959, during a meeting of Turners and Growers management in Auckland, Jack Turner suggested the name kiwifruit after its furry brown appearance similar to the country's endemic flightless bird kiwi; this was adopted and later became the industry-wide name. In the 1960s and 1970s, Frieda Caplan, founder of Los Alamitos-based Frieda's Inc., played a key role in popularising kiwifruit in the United States, convincing supermarket produce managers to carry the odd-looking fruit.

Industry maturation
The growth of the export market during this time was composed of individual growers, grower cooperatives, exporters and distributors. An attempt to develop a joint marketing effort saw the establishment of the Kiwifruit Export Promotion Committee in 1970, followed by the Kiwifruit Marketing Licensing Authority in 1977. The Kiwifruit Marketing Licensing Authority had the rights to establish market standards such as fruit size, quality and packaging of kiwifruit for export markets, the Authority also acted as an adviser to the government. This gave growers some control of licensing exporters.

Industry growth
The total volume of kiwifruit exports rapidly increased from the late 1960s to early 1970s. During this time, the number or exporting firms also dramatically increased. By 1976, the total volume of fruit New Zealand produced had exceeded the volume domestically consumed.

In 1974, kiwifruit was added to the consumer price index (CPI) basket.

Loss of competitive advantage
In the 1980s other countries began to export kiwifruit, and New Zealand lost its first-mover advantage. The seven licensed exporters in New Zealand were in fierce competition, driving down prices. This reduced grower profitability and caused fluctuations in both supply and demand.

Reaction to competition
In the 1990s, the export arrangement was reorganised in response to pressure from increasing fruit supplies from competing overseas export markets. To regain profitability and stability, the New Zealand Government and growers colluded to establish a single-desk export arrangement. This granted a monopoly on the marketing of kiwifruit to Zespri and mandated that all suppliers sell their products through this single buyer (see also monopsony) for all exports outside of Australasia.

All New Zealand kiwifruits are marketed under the brand-name label Zespri. The branding move is also intended to distinguish New Zealand kiwifruit from other fruit and prevent other companies from gaining benefit from the New Zealand Kiwifruit Marketing Board's (a subsidiary of Zespri) activities.

Zespri International Ltd. is owned by 2,700 local growers through Zespri Group Ltd which was established in 2000. Zespri has the role of promoting and selling kiwifruit in overseas markets as well as establishing regulations on which kiwifruit can be sold in the export markets.

State of the industry
Turners & Growers began to challenge Zespri's export monopoly of New Zealand's kiwifruit industry in 2009 to gain the right to export their own kiwifruit varieties without using Zespri. However, in October 2011 the case was dropped in response to pressures from a new bacterial disease causing devastating losses in kiwifruit.

In November 2010, plant symptoms were discovered that suggested that Pseudomonas syringae pv. actinidiae (PSA), a variant of the bacterium Pseudomonas syringae, were present in a Bay of Plenty kiwifruit orchard in the North Island. Provisions of the Biosecurity Act 1993 have been used to limit its spread. These measures were continued in 2011, but were largely unsuccessful with most orchards in the Bay of Plenty displaying some level of infection by November 2011. Some of the attacks in the Bay of Plenty were by the virulent strain PSA-V. The disease is worldwide, with serious attacks in Italy and France also in 2011.

In mid-2013 a China-based Zespri subsidiary was fined nearly $1M for under-declaring customs duties, and the Serious Fraud Office launched an investigation into Zespri itself in October 2013.

Much of the breeding to refine the green kiwifruit and develop the gold Zespri was done by the Plant & Food Research Institute (formerly HortResearch) during the decades of 1970–1999.

In 1990, the New Zealand Kiwifruit Marketing Board opened an office for Europe in Antwerp, Belgium, which became the headquarters for European marketing of Zespri gold kiwifruit in 2010. The general name, "Zespri", has been used for marketing of all green and gold cultivars of kiwifruit from New Zealand since 2012.

In 2017, New Zealand growers were acquiring additional land to grow Zespri gold kiwifruit under rising costs for a Zespri license to meet global demand for the gold cultivar.

In mid-February 2020, the New Zealand Government agreed to pay NZ$40 million to 212 kiwifruit orchardists and Te Puke–based post harvest operator Seeka to settle a class action lawsuit alleging that the government was liable for losses caused by the incursion of the kiwifruit vine disease Pseudomonas syringae (PSA), which swept through the Bay of Plenty region in 2010. Kiwifruit orchardists had initially challenged a Court of Appeal ruling that the Government could not be held liable for the damage caused by PSA despite the Ministry of Primary Industries allowing PSA into the country through the import of kiwifruit pollen from China. As a result of the settlement, the appeal was withdrawn.

Invasive plant
The kiwifruit vine has become an invasive plant species in the Bay of Plenty Region due initially to the dumping of fruit next to bush remnants. The Department of Conservation, responsible for protecting public land, classify Actinidia deliciosa as an environmental weed.

See also
Agriculture in New Zealand

References

Notes

External links
New Zealand Kiwifruit Growers Incorporated
Kiwifruit at Te Ara – The Encyclopedia of New Zealand

Agriculture in New Zealand
Fruit production
New Zealand